The Delbert and Ora Chipman House on E. Main St. in American Fork, Utah was built c.1870s but was extensively renovated and enlarged during approximately 1930–1934.  The renovation and expansion added Tudor Revival or English Cottage architecture.  It was listed on the National Register of Historic Places in 1995.  The listing included two contributing buildings:  the house and a c.1920s sheep barn which has a clerestory roof.

See also
Henry & Elizabeth Parker Chipman House, also in American Fork, also NRHP-listed

References

Houses completed in 1870
Houses on the National Register of Historic Places in Utah
Tudor Revival architecture in Utah
Houses in Utah County, Utah
Buildings and structures in American Fork, Utah
National Register of Historic Places in Utah County, Utah